Blue Area is the central business district of Islamabad, Pakistan along the Jinnah Avenue. The area is a -long corridor along Islamabad's Khayaban-e-Quaid-e-Azam (also known as Jinnah Avenue), Islamabad's primary arterial road which leads up to the main government buildings. It is characterized by clean, wide roads and tall buildings among the panoramic greenery of the adjacent areas.

Etymology 
It is called the "Blue Area", because it was represented in blue color in the original design (master plan) of the planned city.

Transport 
Blue Area is served by Stock Exchange, 7th Avenue, PIMS, and Shaheed-e-Millat metro bus stations on Line 1 of the Rawalpindi-Islamabad Metrobus system.

Public services 
On 4 July 2016, the first state-of-the-art National Database and Registration Authority (NADRA) mega center was inaugurated in Islamabad's Blue Area with a capacity of processing 2,000 applicants daily.

The office has a seating capacity of 300 people, served by 34 counters.

Commercial

Telecom Tower 
It's a 113-meter and 24 floors high-rise building, constructed in 2011 by Pakistan Telecommunication Trust. The development has a parking facility of approximately 400 cars.

Islamabad Stock Exchange
The Islamabad Stock Exchange building is also situated in the Blue Area. On 11 January 2016, the three stock exchanges namely Islamabad Stock Exchange (ISE), Lahore Stock Exchange (LSE) and Karachi Stock Exchange (KSE) all merged to become Pakistan Stock Exchange (PSX).

This is 22 storeys building, equipped with modern fire-fighting systems and other facilities.

The Centaurus Mall

Designed by British architectural firm WS Atkins, it consists of three skyscrapers, containing corporate offices, residential apartments, and a hotel. It is between Sectors F-8 and G-8, primarily situated at the junction of the two main artery roads of Islamabad, Jinnah Avenue and Faisal Avenue. 

The Centaurus Mövenpick Hotel is under-construction and is expected to open in the first quarter of 2018. The estimated cost for building the complex was US$350 million. 

On 28 April 2013, a Mothers Day March (Mamta March) was organized in three major cities of Pakistan where people gathered at The Centaurus Mall in Islamabad, Fortress Stadium in Lahore, and Port Grand in Karachi to participate in this march.

Saudi-Pak Tower
The Saudi Pak Tower is a 19-floors office building, where a dozen multinational companies are operating, including European companies, American TV channels and multinational companies from Chinese and Middle Eastern regions.

Buildings
Oil & Gas Development Company
Saudi-Pak Tower
 Telecom Tower Islamabad
 Kuslum International Hospital
United Bank Limited building
The Centaurus Mall
HBL Pakistan building
Islamabad Stock Exchange building

Gallery

References

 
Business parks of Pakistan
Central business districts in Pakistan
Islamabad